Derrett may refer to:

 Steve Derrett, Welsh footballer
 J Duncan M Derrett, Professor of Oriental Laws in the University of London
 Tom Derrett, bassist of Morning Runner